David Bagan (born 26 April 1977 in Irvine, North Ayrshire) is a Scottish former football player who played as a winger.

Bagan began his career at Troon before signing for Kilmarnock, where he won the Scottish Cup in 1997. He joined Inverness CT in 2000 after being released by Kilmarnock, then signed for Queen of the South in 2003 after again being released. He also played St Johnstone, Raith Rovers, Dumbarton and Irvine Meadow. He signed for Hurlford United in January 2009. He also represented the Scotland under-21 national team.

Honours

Club

Kilmarnock:
 Scottish Cup: 1997

References

External links

1977 births
Living people
Footballers from Irvine, North Ayrshire
Scottish footballers
Association football midfielders
Troon F.C. players
Kilmarnock F.C. players
Inverness Caledonian Thistle F.C. players
Queen of the South F.C. players
St Johnstone F.C. players
Raith Rovers F.C. players
Irvine Meadow XI F.C. players
Dumbarton F.C. players
Hurlford United F.C. players
Scotland under-21 international footballers
Scottish Football League players
Scottish Premier League players
Scottish Junior Football Association players